Hélio Fernandes (11 January 1921 – 10 March 2021) was a Brazilian journalist.

He owned the newspaper Tribuna da Imprensa from 1962 until his death. Hélio was the father of journalists Rodolfo Fernandes and Hélio Fernandes Filho and brother of the artist and comedian Millôr Fernandes.

Biography 
Hélio Fernandes was born on January 11, 1921, in Rio de Janeiro, Brazil. In 1933, he started working for the O Cruzeiro magazine with his brother Millôr Fernandes and worked for 16 years. He became head of the sports section of the Diario Carioca and then the director of the Manchete (revista) after Diario Carioca closed.

References

1921 births
2021 deaths
Brazilian journalists
Brazilian centenarians
Male journalists
20th-century journalists
Men centenarians